The Joseph Braman House is a historic house located at Braman's Corners in Duanesburg, Schenectady County, New York.

Description and history 
It was built in the 1850s and is a two-story, three-bay wide frame building on a random-coursed stone foundation in a constructed vernacular Greek Revival style. It has a gabled roof, flanking one-story wings, and a -story rear wing. Also on the property is a contributing carriage house.

The property was covered in a 1984 study of Duanesburg historical resources. It was listed on the National Register of Historic Places on April 24, 1987.

References

Houses on the National Register of Historic Places in New York (state)
Houses in Schenectady County, New York
Greek Revival houses in New York (state)
National Register of Historic Places in Schenectady County, New York